Estácio Station is a subway station on the Rio de Janeiro Metro that serves Estácio neighbourhood, in Rio de Janeiro.

References

Metrô Rio stations
Railway stations opened in 1980